Markus Thätner (born February 11, 1985, in Frankfurt an der Oder, Brandenburg) is an amateur German Greco-Roman wrestler, who played for the men's welterweight category. He won a bronze medal for his division at the 2007 European Wrestling Championships in Sofia, Bulgaria.

Thatner represented Germany at the 2008 Summer Olympics in Beijing, where he competed for the men's 66 kg class. He received a bye for the preliminary round of sixteen match, before losing out to Kazakhstan's Darkhan Bayakhmetov, with a two-set technical score (1–2, 1–3), and a classification point score of 1–3.

References

External links
Profile – International Wrestling Database
NBC 2008 Olympics profile

1985 births
Living people
Olympic wrestlers of Germany
Wrestlers at the 2008 Summer Olympics
Sportspeople from Frankfurt (Oder)
German male sport wrestlers
20th-century German people
21st-century German people